The term Most Outstanding Player may refer to:

 The recipient of the CFL's Most Outstanding Player Award
 The NCAA basketball tournament Most Outstanding Player award
 The College World Series Most Outstanding Player in college baseball
 The NCAA Division I Ice Hockey Tournament Most Outstanding Player in college ice hockey
 The WCHA Most Outstanding Player in Tournament in college ice hockey